Wade in the Water is an album by Ramsey Lewis, issued in 1966 on Cadet Records. The album rose to No. 2 on the Billboard Top Soul Albums chart.

Critical reception
The track "Hold It Right There" won a Grammy Award for Best Rhythm & Blues Group Performance - Vocal or Instrumental.

Singles
The album's title track got to No. 3 on the Billboard Top Soul Singles chart.

Track listing

Side 1
"Wade in the Water" 	(Traditional)  (3:46) 	
"Ain't That Peculiar" 	(Pete Moore, Smokey Robinson, Bobby Rogers, Marv Tarplin)  (2:48)	
"Tobacco Road' 		(John D. Loudermilk)  (4:34)
"Money in the Pocket" 	(Joe Zawinul)  (2:41)	
"Message to Michael" 	(Burt Bacharach, Hal David)  (3:09)

Side 2
"Uptight (Everything's Alright)" (Henry Cosby, Stevie Judkins, Sylvia Moy) (5:44) 		
"Hold It Right There" 	(Richard Evans)  (2:24)	
"Day Tripper" (John Lennon, Paul McCartney) (3:07) 
"Mi Compasion" 		(Esmond Edwards)  (3:06)
"Hurt So Bad"            (Teddy Randazzo, Bobby Weinstein, Robert Harshman)  (3:04)

Personnel
 Ramsey Lewis – keyboards
  John Avant – trombone
  Cleveland Eaton – bass
  Richard Evans – arrangements, conductor
 Maurice White – drums
Technical
 Bob Kidder, Bruce Swedien – recording engineer
Don Bronstein – cover photography

References

Ramsey Lewis albums
1966 albums
Albums produced by Esmond Edwards
Cadet Records albums